Copper(II) selenite is an inorganic salt frequently found as its dihydrate, CuSeO3·2H2O, in the form of a blue powder.

Preparation 
Copper(II) selenite can be prepared from copper(II) acetate and selenous acid.

Uses 
Copper(II) selenite can be used a catalyst for Kjeldahl digestion.

See also 
 Selenite
 Selenous acid

References 

Selenites
Copper(II) compounds